Alexander Mark Rossi (1840 – 9 January 1916) was a successful British artist specializing in genre works who flourished in the late 19th century.

Biography
He was born on the Greek Island of Corfu, the son of Dr Mark Rossi, an Italian who was one of the three judges presiding over the Ionian Islands during the time of British rule. On a visit to Preston, England in 1866, Rossi met and later married Jane Gillow.  He remained in the United Kingdom thereafter. In the 1870s he moved to London.

Between 1871 and 1903, Rossi exhibited 66 works at the Royal Academy and was also a member of the Hogarth Club. Many of his paintings were of children and young adults, the models often being members of his own family. Perhaps his most well-known painting is Forbidden Books (1897).

After his first wife's death, he married Silvia Tassart in 1902. He died in Golders Green, London on 9 January 1916.

Note: Some British art houses mistakenly give Rossi's birth and death dates as 1870-1903, but these actually refer to the dates that he was active on the London art scene.

References

External links
Paintings by Alexander Rossi (Art Renewal Center Museum - 14 Dec 2010)
Works by A. M. Rossi (Bridgeman Art Library)
Works by A. M. Rossi ("Eras of Elegance")

19th-century British painters
British male painters
20th-century British painters
British watercolourists
English people of Italian descent
Artists from Corfu
1840 births
1916 deaths
19th-century British male artists
20th-century British male artists